Alcohol dehydrogenase (quinone) (type III ADH, membrane associated quinohaemoprotein alcohol dehydrogenase) is an enzyme with systematic name alcohol:quinone oxidoreductase. This enzyme catalyses the following chemical reaction

 ethanol + ubiquinone  acetaldehyde + ubiquinol

This enzyme is present in acetic acid bacteria where it is involved in acetic acid production.

References

External links 
 

EC 1.1.5